The following highways are numbered 358:

Canada
 Nova Scotia Route 358
Prince Edward Island Route 358
 Quebec Route 358
Saskatchewan Highway 358

Japan
 Japan National Route 358

United States
  Arkansas Highway 358
  Georgia State Route 358
  Indiana State Road 358
  Kentucky Route 358
  Maryland Route 358
  New York State Route 358 (former)
  Ohio State Route 358
  Pennsylvania Route 358
  Puerto Rico Highway 358
  Tennessee State Route 358
 Texas:
  Texas State Highway 358
  Texas State Highway Loop 358 (former)
  Virginia State Route 358